Shuidongdi is a rural town in Louxing District of Loudi, Hunan, China. The town has 24 villages and a community under its jurisdiction. The town was transferred from Lianyuan City to Louxing on January 24, 2017.

Administrative division
The town is divided into 45 villages and 1 community, the following areas: Xianghong Community, Chengtian Village, Qiushu Village, Changbu Village, Wenquan Village, Tiantang Village, Yutian Village, Dayuelong Village, Datian Village, Nanqiao Village, Xixi Village, Munong Village, Yangjiao Village, Jingchong Village, Tuoshan Village, Zhongxin Village, Shijiao Village, Niqing Village, Hongtu Village, Lishan Village, Zhujiao Village, Shuidongdi Village, Zhuyou Village, Muchang Village, Shishi Village, Hehua Village, Pantang Village, Xintang Village, Liutan Village, Shiquan Village, Huaishu Village, Huyan Village, Zhouguan Village, Bailong Village, Baihuang Village, Xinshi Village, Guozhu Village, Xiaoyang Village, Yangcai Village, Sanqiao Village, Yunhua Village, Hongquan Village, Jintang Village, Yunshan Village, and Gaoxian Village.

Geography
The town is bordered to the north by Shijing Town, to the east by Wanbao Town, to the south by Hetang Town of Lianyuan, to the west by Doulishan Town, and to the southwest by Fengping Town.

Transportation

Railway
The Luoyang–Zhanjiang Railway, from Luoyang City, Henan Province to Zhanjiang City, Guangdong Province runs through the town.

The Shanghai–Kunming high-speed railway runs west-east through the southern town.

Expressway
S70 Loudi–Huaihua Expressway, more commonly known as "Louhuai Expressway", is a west-east highway passing through the town.

References

Divisions of Lianyuan